Richland Cemetery is a historic African-American cemetery located at Greenville, South Carolina. It was established in 1884 by the City of Greenville as the first municipal "colored" cemetery. It is the final resting place for many of Greenville's most notable African-American educators, health practitioners, and community leaders. The total number of graves is estimated at over 1,400 and gravemarker types and materials range from natural stones to elaborate Victorian monuments.

It was added to the National Register of Historic Places in 2005.

References

External links
 

African-American history of South Carolina
Cemeteries on the National Register of Historic Places in South Carolina
1884 establishments in South Carolina
Protected areas of Greenville County, South Carolina
National Register of Historic Places in Greenville, South Carolina
Tourist attractions in Greenville, South Carolina